M. K. Hobson (born January 21, 1969) is an American speculative fiction and fantasy writer. In 2003 she was a Pushcart Prize nominee, and her debut novel The Native Star was nominated for the 2010 Nebula Award. She lives in Oregon City, Oregon.

Hobson's short fiction has appeared in magazines such as Sci Fiction, the Magazine of Fantasy and Science Fiction, Realms of Fantasy, Strange Horizons, and ChiZine. Her work has also appeared in anthologies such as Polyphony 5 and Polyphony 6 and Medicine Show. Hobson's story "The Hand of the Devil on a String" appeared on the 2008 Best American Fantasy recommended reading list, and her other work has received Honorable Mentions in "Year’s Best Fantasy and Horror" and "Year’s Best Science Fiction."

She is the author of the Veneficas Americana historical fantasy series. The first novel in the series, The Native Star, was published by Bantam Spectra on August 31, 2010. The sequel, The Hidden Goddess, followed on April 26, 2011. The third novel, The Warlock's Curse, begins a new duology and follows characters from a new generation. Hobson has described the style of the first two novels as "Bustlepunk.".

She is also a co-host of the fantasy podcast PodCastle, a sister podcast of Escape Pod. In the past, she was co-editor—with author Douglas Lain—of the surrealist/anarchist 'zine Diet Soap.

Bibliography

Novels
The Native Star (August 31, 2010) Bantam Spectra
The Hidden Goddess (April 26, 2011) Bantam Spectra.
The Warlock's Curse (October 31, 2012) Demimonde.

Short Stories
Several of Hobson's short stories are available online, including:
 The Hotel Astarte, Realms of Fantasy, June 2007.
 Severance Pay, Strange Horizons, September 2005.
Domovoi, The Magazine of Fantasy and Science Fiction, April 2005
 Hell Notes, SCI FICTION, February 2005
 Ice Cream, Vestal Review, October 2003
 The Principessa of Montenegro, flashquake, Fall 2003

References

External links

Demimonde, M. K. Hobson's official site, with links to complete bibliography, blog, and upcoming conventions.
The Voices in My Head Don't Think They're Imaginary, M. K. Hobson's LiveJournal
M. K. Hobson: Bustlepunk, author interview in Locus.
Diet Soap, the official site of the Diet Soap printzine.
Interview with M. K. Hobson by Marshall Payne, The Fix.
Author Interview, Shimmer Magazine.
The Clarion Quandary, a Point-Counterpoint, published in The Broadsheet.
History As It Wasn’t: Writing Historical Fantasy published in The Broadsheet.

1969 births
Living people
Novelists from Oregon
American fantasy writers
American science fiction writers
People from Oregon City, Oregon
Writers from Riverside, California
21st-century American novelists
21st-century American women writers
Women science fiction and fantasy writers
American women novelists